Ancylis is a genus of moths belonging to the subfamily Olethreutinae of the family Tortricidae.

Species

Ancylis achatana Denis & Schiffermüller, 1775
Ancylis acromochla Turner, 1946
Ancylis albacostana Kearfott, 1905
Ancylis albafascia Heinrich, 1929
Ancylis amplimacula Falkovitsh, 196
Ancylis ancorata Meyrick, 1912
Ancylis anguillana Meyrick, 1881
Ancylis anthophanes Meyrick, 1928
Ancylis anthracaspis Meyrick, in Caradja, 1931
Ancylis apicana Walker, 1866
Ancylis apicella Denis & Schiffermüller, 1775
Ancylis apicipicta Oku, 2005
Ancylis arcitenens Meyrick, 1922
Ancylis argenticiliana Walsingham, 1897
Ancylis argillacea Turner, 1916
Ancylis aromatias Meyrick, 1912
Ancylis artifica Meyrick, 1911
Ancylis atricapilla Meyrick, 1917
Ancylis badiana Denis & Schiffermüller, 1775
Ancylis bauhiniae Busck, 1934
Ancylis biscissana Meyrick, 1881
Ancylis brauni Heinrich, 1931
Ancylis bucovinella Peiu & Nemes, 1969
Ancylis burgessiana Zeller, 1875
Ancylis carbonana Heinrich, 1923
Ancylis carpalima Meyrick, 1911
Ancylis caudifer Stringer, 1929
Ancylis celerata Meyrick, 1912
Ancylis charisema Meyrick, 1934
Ancylis colonota Meyrick, 1911
Ancylis columbiana McDunnough, 1955
Ancylis comptana Frolich, 1828
Ancylis comptanoides Strand, 1920
Ancylis convergens Diakonoff, 1984
Ancylis cordiae Busck, 1934
Ancylis cornifoliana Riley, 1881
Ancylis coronopa Meyrick, 1911
Ancylis corylicolana Kuznetzov, 1962
Ancylis definitivana Heinrich, 1923
Ancylis diminutana Haworth, 1811
Ancylis discigerana Walker, 1863
Ancylis divisana Walker, 1863
Ancylis enneametra Meyrick, 1927
Ancylis erythrana Meyrick, 1881
Ancylis erythrosema Turner, 1945
Ancylis falcata Walsingham, 1891
Ancylis falsicoma Meyrick, 1914
Ancylis fergusoni McDunnough, 1958
Ancylis fidana Meyrick, 1881
Ancylis floridana Zeller, 1875
Ancylis forsterana Bachmaier, 1965
Ancylis fuscociliana Clemens, 1864
Ancylis galeamatana McDunnough, 1956
Ancylis geminana Donovan, 1806
Ancylis gigas Razowski, 2009
Ancylis glycyphaga Meyrick, 1912
Ancylis goodelliana Fernald, 1882
Ancylis habeleri Huemer & Tarmann, 1997
Ancylis halisparta Meyrick, 1910
Ancylis hemicatharta Meyrick, in Caradja & Meyrick, 1935
Ancylis hibbertiana Meyrick, 1881
Ancylis himerodana Meyrick, 1881
Ancylis hygroberylla Meyrick in Caradja & Meyrick, 1937
Ancylis hylaea Meyrick, 1912
Ancylis impatiens Meyrick, 1921
Ancylis infectana Meyrick, 1881
Ancylis karafutonis Matsumura, 1911
Ancylis kenneli Kuznetzov, 1962
Ancylis kincaidiana Fernald, 1900
Ancylis kurentzovi Kuznetzov, 1969
Ancylis laciniana Zeller, 1875
Ancylis laetana Fabricius, 1775
Ancylis limosa Oku, 2005
Ancylis loktini Kuznetzov, 1969
Ancylis lomholdti Kawabe, 1989
Ancylis longestriata Durrant, 1891
Ancylis luana Laharpe, 1864
Ancylis lutescens Meyrick, 1912
Ancylis mandarinana Walsingham, 1900
Ancylis maritima Dyar, 1904
Ancylis mediofasciana Clemens, 1864
Ancylis melanostigma Kuznetzov, 1970
Ancylis mesoscia Meyrick, 1911
Ancylis metamelana Walker, 1863
Ancylis minimana Caradja, 1916
Ancylis mira Heinrich, 1929
Ancylis mitterbacheriana Denis & Schiffermüller, 1775
Ancylis monochroa Diakonoff, 1984
Ancylis muricana Walsingham, 1879
Ancylis myrtillana Treitschke, 1830
Ancylis natalana Walsingham, 1881
Ancylis nemorana Kuznetzov, 1969
Ancylis nomica Walsingham, 1914
Ancylis nubeculana Clemens, 1860
Ancylis obtusana Haworth, [1811]
Ancylis oculifera Walsingham, 1891
Ancylis oestobola Diakonoff, 1984
Ancylis pacificana Walsingham, 1879
Ancylis paludana Barrett, 1871
Ancylis partitana Christoph, 1882
Ancylis phileris Meyrick, 1910
Ancylis platanana Clemens, 1860
Ancylis plumbata Clarke, 1951
Ancylis pseustis Meyrick, 1911
Ancylis repandana Kennel, 1901
Ancylis rhacodyta Meyrick, 1938
Ancylis rhenana Müller-Rutz, 1920
Ancylis rhoderana McDunnough, 1954
Ancylis rimosa Meyrick, 1921
Ancylis sativa Liu, 1979
Ancylis sciodelta Meyrick, 1921
Ancylis sederana Chrétien, 1915
Ancylis segetana Meyrick, 1881
Ancylis selenana Guenée, 1845
Ancylis semiovana Zeller, 1875
Ancylis shastensis McDunnough, 1955
Ancylis sheppardana McDunnough, 1956
Ancylis simuloides McDunnough, 1955
Ancylis sophroniella Walsingham, 1907
Ancylis sparulana Staudinger, 1859
Ancylis spinicola Meyrick, 1927
Ancylis spiraeifoliana Clemens, 1860
Ancylis stenampyx Diakonoff, 1982
Ancylis stilpna Turner, 1925
Ancylis subaequana Zeller, 1875
Ancylis synomotis Meyrick, 1911
Ancylis tenebrica Heinrich, 1929
Ancylis thalera Meyrick, 1907
Ancylis tineana Hübner, 1796-1799
Ancylis torontana Kearfott, 1907
Ancylis transientana Filipjev, 1926
Ancylis tumida Meyrick, 1912
Ancylis uncella Denis & Schiffermüller, 1775
Ancylis unculana Haworth, 1811
Ancylis unguicella Linnaeus, 1758
Ancylis upupana Treitschke, 1835
Ancylis virididorsana Möschler, 1891
Ancylis volutana Meyrick, 1881
Ancylis youmiae Byun & Yan, 2005

See also
List of Tortricidae genera

References

External links
Tortricid.net

Enarmoniini
Tortricidae genera